The Confession is a 1970 French-Italian film directed by Costa-Gavras starring Yves Montand and Simone Signoret.

It is based on the true story of the Czechoslovak communist committed leftist Artur London, a defendant in the Slánský trial. Gavras did not intend the film as an anti-communist film but as a plea against totalitarianism and Stalinism.

Plot
Artur Ludvik, alias Gerard, is a loyal communist and hero of WWII who serves as the vice-minister of Foreign Affairs of Czechoslovakia in 1951. He realizes he is being watched and followed, and meets to discuss this with a group of his friends who have also attained top government positions. They realize they are all being watched, even the chief of the same secret police force that is carrying out the surveillance. One day, Artur is arrested and jailed by an organization that declares itself "above the ruling party", and put in solitary confinement for months without being told the reason why. His wife Lise and their children are kept in the dark by the government and told to cooperate for their own good; Lise is later removed from her job as a prominent radio news announcer and forced to work in a factory by the party. Though she believes in her husband, she is equally certain in the wisdom and ultimate goodness of the party.

Through brainwashing techniques, including sleep deprivation and being forced to walk back and forth all the time, Artur is slowly pressured into confessing imaginary crimes, including treason, and baited with the prospect of leniency at sentencing if he cooperates. He also learns that his friends have been arrested as well and are implicating him in crimes against the state. Upon finally confessing to his alleged crimes, Artur is then groomed for a public "trial", which will be broadcast live on radio and shown in cinemas. While his captors coach him to memorize prepared answers by rote, he is given robust meals, vitamin injections, and a sunlamp to improve his appearance after years of wasting.

At the trial, Artur and his colleagues faithfully play their parts. Lise, to her shame, is forced to make a recorded statement disavowing her husband and praising the party which airs during the trial. The prisoners are variously sentenced to either death or life imprisonment, with Artur given the latter. When their interrogators do not return to them, the prisoners panic and threaten to appeal, but are told by their court-appointed lawyers that the sentences are only for the party's benefit and will not be enforced if they do not appeal. The convicted men appear in court one final time to accept their sentences and waive their right to appeal.

Afterwards, Artur and some of his colleagues are gradually freed and rehabilitated between 1956 and 1963. However, the rest are executed and cremated, with their ashes scattered along a road. At the same time, a number of the officials behind the ordeal end up facing their own persecutions, including Kohoutek, Artur's own interrogator. Artur later encounters the demoted Kohoutek, who tries to downplay his role in Artur's torment by claiming he was only following orders and never understood what the party wanted.

In 1968, Artur completes his memoirs of his experiences in captivity and returns to Czechoslovakia to have them published. By then, amidst the Prague Spring, the reactionary elements who had orchestrated the entire affair had been pushed out of power by the party, and Artur believed that the party now desired to expose the truth of what happened during those years as much as Artur himself did. Unfortunately, he arrives in Prague just as the Warsaw Pact invasion of Czechoslovakia begins.

Cast 

 Yves Montand – Artur Ludvik
 Simone Signoret – Lise Ludvik
 Michel Vitold – Smola
 Gabriele Ferzetti – Kohoutek
 Jean Bouise – the factory head
  – Josef Pavel
 Gérard Darrieu – a policeman
 Gilles Segal
 Henri Marteau
  – a policeman
 Michel Beaune – the lawyer
 Jacques Rispal
 Michel Robin  – the prosecutor
  – Tonda
 Marc Bonseignour
 
 
 Monique Chaumette
 Marc Eyraud
 Jean-François Gobbi
 
 William Jacques
 Guy Mairesse
 François Marthouret
 Umberto Raho
 Laszlo Szabo
 Antoine Vitez

Production
Montand had been shaken by the  1956 events in Hungary and later said of the film: "There was in what I inflicted upon myself [for this role] something of an act of expiation."

Reception and awards
Vincent Canby in The New York Times in December 1970 did not consider The Confession a better film than Z (1969), but because the subject of this film "is much more complex, much more human, I find it vastly more interesting". It is "a harrowing film of intellectual and emotional anguish, dramatized by the breathless devices of melodrama." Roger Ebert wrote in April 1971: "It is not a thriller like Z, and it couldn't be, because there is no justice to emerge at the end and no scoundrels to unmask." The director, he wrote, "has made a point of insisting that the movie is anti-Stalinist, not anti-Communist." London remained a  communist at the time the film was made. Pauline Kael wrote in The New Yorker that the film is a "thoughtful, intelligent demonstration of how strong, idealistic men of character are turned into pawns of history". Although the film is "subdued, Costa-Gavras's work has tremendous zing, but it's not until the movie is almost over that it gains resonance."

Ronald Bergan and Robyn Karney in the Bloomsbury Foreign Film Guide (1988) wrote: "the screenplay's static  and wordy nature is not sufficiently tempered by the direction or the playing. However, some of the interrogation scenes which lead to the false confession of the title cannot fail to have an impact."

The film was nominated for the Golden Globes and BAFTA Awards as Best Foreign Language Film.

References

External links 
 
The Confession: Enthralling Absurdity an essay by Dina Iordanova at the Criterion Collection

1970 films
1970 drama films
Films directed by Costa Gavras
Italian drama films
Films about capital punishment
Films about miscarriage of justice
Drama films based on actual events
Films based on non-fiction books
Films set in Prague
French drama films
Films critical of communism
Films produced by Robert Dorfmann
Films scored by Giovanni Fusco
Films set in Czechoslovakia
Films set in 1951
Films set in 1968
1970s French-language films
1970s Italian films
1970s French films